Treis-Sants-en-Ouche is a commune in the Eure department in Normandy in northern France. It was established on 1 January 2019 by merger of the former communes of Saint-Aubin-le-Vertueux (the seat), Saint-Clair-d'Arcey and Saint-Quentin-des-Isles.

See also
Communes of the Eure department

References

Communes of Eure